Tidal flooding, also known as sunny day flooding or nuisance flooding, is the temporary inundation of low-lying areas, especially streets, during exceptionally high tide events, such as at full and new moons. The highest tides of the year may be known as the king tide, with the month varying by location. These kinds of floods tend not to be a high risk to property or human safety, but further stress coastal infrastructure in low lying areas. 

This kind of flooding is becoming more common in cities and other human-occupied coastal areas as sea level rise  associated with climate change and other human-related environmental impacts such as coastal erosion and land subsidence increase the vulnerability of infrastructure. Geographies faced with these issues can utilize coastal management practices to mitigate the effects in some areas, but increasingly these kinds of floods may develop into coastal flooding that requires managed retreat or other more extensive climate change adaptation practices are needed for vulnerable areas.

Effects on infrastructure 
Tidal flooding is capable of greatly inhibiting natural gravity-based drainage systems in low-lying areas when it reaches levels that are below visible inundation of the surface, but which are high enough to incapacitate the lower drainage or sewer system. Thus, even normal rainfall or storm surge events can cause greatly amplified flooding effects. One passive solution to intrusion through drainage systems are one way back-flow valves in drainage ways. However, while this may prevent a majority of the tidal intrusion, it also inhibits drainage during exceptionally high tides that shut the valves. In Miami Beach, where resilience work is underway, the pump systems replace insufficient gravity-based systems.

Relation to climate change 
Sunny day flooding is often associated with coastal regions, where sea level rise attributed to global warming can send water into the streets on days with elevated high tides. Further, regions with glaciers also experience sunny day flooding as climate change alters the dynamics of glacier meltwater. Abnormally hot temperatures not only swell rivers and creeks directly through accelerated snowmelt, but can burst ice dams and cause water from glacial lakes to swell waterways less predictably.

A warming climate causes physical changes to the types of ice on a glacier. As glaciers retreat, there is less firn (water-retaining snow) so that more meltwater runs directly into the watershed over deeper, impervious glacial ice.

Affected geographies

United States

Most of the coastal communities in the Eastern Seaboard of the United States are vulnerable to this kind of flooding as sea level rise increases.

Due to changing geography such as subsidence, and poorly planned development, tidal flooding may exist separate from modern nuisance flooding associated with sea level rise and anthropocentric climate change. The widely publicized Holland Island in Maryland for example has disappeared over the years mainly due to subsidence and coastal erosion. In the New Orleans area on the Gulf Coast of Louisiana, land subsidence results in the Grand Isle tide gauge showing an extreme upward sea level trend.

Florida 

In Florida, controversy arose when state-level government mandated that the term "nuisance flooding" and other terms be used in place of terms such as sea level rise, climate change and global warming, prompting allegations of climate change denial, specifically against Governor Rick Scott. This amid Florida, specifically South Florida and the Miami metropolitan area being one of the most at risk areas in the world for the potential effects of sea level rise, and where the frequency and severity of tidal flooding events increased in the 21st century.

In the Miami metropolitan area, where the vast majority of the land is below , even a one-foot increase over the average high tide can cause widespread flooding. NOAA tide gauge data for most stations shows current water level graphs relative to a fixed vertical datum, as well as mean sea level trends for some stations. During the king tides, the local Miami area tide gauge at Virginia Key shows levels running at times  or more over datum.

Fort Lauderdale has installed over one hundred tidal valves since 2013 to combat flooding.

A recent University of Florida study correlated the increased tidal flooding in south Florida, at least from 2011–2015 to episodic atmospheric conditions. The rate was about 3/4 of an inch (19 mm) per year, versus the global rate of just over a tenth of an inch (3 mm) per year.

See also 

 Acqua alta, tidal peaks in the northern Adriatic Sea which cause flooding in the Venetian Lagoon

References

External links
 
 Water Levels for Virginia Key Tide Gauge (Miami)
 South Florida's Rising Seas - Sea Level Rise Documentary, South Florida PBS

Tides
Flood